Celia Parker Woolley (June 14, 1848 – March 9, 1918) was an American novelist, Unitarian minister and social reformer. She also served as a president of the Chicago Woman's Club and the founder of the Frederick Douglass Woman's Club.

Biography
She was born Celia Parker on June 14, 1848, in Toledo, Ohio. She moved to Coldwater, Michigan when she was young. She later graduated from Coldwater Female Seminary and, in 1868, she was married to dentist J. H. Woolley, and in 1876 moved to Chicago. The couple had one child who died in adolescence.

Woolley began studies for the ministry, and became pastor of the Unitarian Church of Geneva, Illinois, 1893–1896, being ordained in 1894. She was then pastor of the Independent Liberal Church, Chicago, 1896–98.

In 1904 she moved with her husband to Chicago's South Side to do social work, because she was concerned with issues of racism and human rights. In 1904 she established the Frederick Douglass Center in order to promote opportunities for blacks as well as work on promoting better interracial relationships and cooperation. In 1906, she founded the Frederick Douglass Woman's Club, one of the few interracial women's clubs in Chicago.

She was active as a lecturer and in the work of women's clubs. Some of this work emphasized literature and related biography. George Eliot and Robert Browning were two interests.

She died in Chicago's South Side on March 9, 1918.

Selected works
 Love and Theology, novel (1887; republished as Rachel Armstrong, or, Love and Theology)
 A Girl Graduate, novel (1889)
 Roger Hunt, novel (1893)
 The Western Slope, autobiographical and historical (1903)

References

Bibliography
 
 

1848 births
1918 deaths
19th-century American women writers
19th-century American novelists
20th-century American novelists
20th-century American women writers
American Unitarian clergy
American women novelists
American suffragists
American community activists
Clubwomen